Artemis is the fifth studio album by American violinist, singer, and songwriter Lindsey Stirling, released on September 6, 2019.

Singles
The first single, "Underground", was released on June 21, 2019. Its music video debuted the same day, and features cameo appearances by Sofie Dossi, BDASH, and Miranda Wilking.

On July 5, 2019, the second single, "The Upside" was released.

On August 3, 2019, a version of "The Upside" featuring Elle King was released as the third single. The second version of the song not only adds King's vocals, but also makes changes in the rest of the song.

On August 26, 2019, the third single and title track, "Artemis", was premiered during a live virtual reality concert in the PC VR application Wave, which was also livestreamed and made viewable afterward on Lindsey Stirling's Facebook page and YouTube channel.

Critical reception

Artemis received positive reviews from music critics.

Track listing

 Mozella and Maize Jane Olinger are credited together under the pseudonym 'Mozella & Maize'.

Charts

Music videos

References 

2019 albums
Lindsey Stirling albums

BMG Rights Management albums